In stereochemistry, prochiral molecules are those that can be converted from achiral to chiral in a single step. An achiral species which can be converted to a chiral in two steps is called proprochiral.

If two identical substituents are attached to a sp3-hybridized atom, the descriptors pro-R and pro-S are used to distinguish between the two. Promoting the pro-R substituent to higher priority than the other identical substituent results in an R chirality center at the original sp3-hybridized atom, and analogously for the pro-S substituent.

A trigonal planar sp2-hybridized atom can be converted to a chiral center when a substituent is added to the re or si face of the molecule. A face is labeled re if, when looking at that face, the substituents at the trigonal atom are arranged in increasing Cahn-Ingold-Prelog priority order (1 to 2 to 3) in a clockwise order, and si if the priorities increase in anti-clockwise order; note that the designation of the resulting chiral center as S or R depends on the priority of the incoming group.

The concept of prochirality is necessary for  understanding some aspects of enzyme stereospecificity. Alexander Ogston pointed out that when a symmetrical molecule is placed in an asymmetric environment, such as the surface of an enzyme, supposedly identically placed groups become distinguishable. In this way he showed that earlier exclusion of non-chiral citrate as a possible intermediate in the tricarboxylate cycle was mistaken.

References 

Stereochemistry